Festival of Flanders is an annual music event at different locations in Flanders. It started initially as a "Summer Festival", but now its activities are spread from January to May, with a peak in late summer and early autumn.

History
The Festival of Flanders has its roots in Tongeren, Limburg, where Jan Briers organized the Basilica-concerts from 1958 in the basilica of Tongeren. At first there was played religiously inspired choral music, but soon it was extended to other classical music, instrumental music; and other locations. Often, historical sites such as abbeys and castles are used, with an occasional transfer to Maastricht.

As in other Flemish cities (classical) summer concerts were held as well, they joined forces in 1972 and created the more comprehensive 'Festival of Flanders'.

The organization was actively supported by the newly emancipated Flemish "cultural autonomy". Especially in Brussels they wanted to exhibit "serious" Flemish culture. Partly  because of this, they could bring prestigious orchestras and big names to Flanders. At the same time it gave the festival a somewhat elitist character.

In the nineties, they began to see the creation of this one-sided image and so the program was expanded to include contemporary music, sound art, youth, jazz, organ music, musical theater, and cross-overs with visual arts, film, dance.

Spreading
The Festival of Flanders consists of various festivals spread across different Flemish cities and provinces:
Antwerp:
 Laus Polyphoniae:
Bruges:
 MAfestival Brugge
Brussels:
 KlaraFestival/The European Galas/Living Room Music/MusMA/Dorp op stap/Festival on Tour http://www.festivalbrxl.be/en
Ghent:
 Gent Festival van Vlaanderen
Kortrijk:
 Happy New Festival van Vlaanderen
Limburg:
 Basilica Festival van Vlaanderen
Mechelen:
 Mechelen hoort stemmen/Festival+/Festival Kempen
Flemish Brabant:
 NOVECENTO
 TRANSIT

References

External links 
  Website des Festival de Wallonie

Entertainment in Flanders
Music festivals in Belgium
Music festivals established in 1958
Classical music festivals in Belgium